Nevada County is a county located in the U.S. state of California, in the Sierra Nevada. As of the 2020 census, its population was 102,241. The county seat is Nevada City. Nevada County comprises the Truckee-Grass Valley micropolitan statistical area, which is also included in the Sacramento-Roseville combined statistical area, part of the Mother Lode Country.

History

Created in 1851, from portions of Yuba County, Nevada County was named after the mining town of Nevada City, a name derived from the Sierra Nevada Mountains. The word nevada is Spanish for "snowy" or "snow-covered."  Charles Marsh was one of the first settlers in what became Nevada City, and ts perhaps the one who named the town.  He went on to build extensive water flumes/ditches/canals in the area, and was influential in the building of the first transcontinental railroad and the Nevada County Narrow Gauge Railroad.

Nevada City was the first to use the word "Nevada" in its name. In 1851, the newly formed Nevada County used the same name as the county seat. The bordering state of Nevada used the same name in 1864. The region came to life in the Gold Rush of 1849. Many historical sites remain to mark the birth of this important region in California's formative years. Among them are the Nevada Theatre in Nevada City, the oldest theater built in California in 1865. It operates to this day and once hosted Mark Twain, among other historical figures. The Old 5 Mile House stagecoach stop, built in 1890, also operates to this day as a provider of hospitality spanning three centuries. This historical site still features "The stagecoach safe" that is on display outside the present-day restaurant and is the source of many legends of stagecoach robbers and notorious highwaymen in the California gold rush era. The gold industry in Nevada County thrived into the post-WWII days.

The county had many firsts and historic technological moments. It was operated by the Milton Mining Company from a building on this site that had been erected about 1853. The Pelton wheel, designed to power gold mines, still drives hydroelectric generators today. Nevada City and Grass Valley were among the first California towns with electric lights. The Olympics, NASA, and virtually every television station around the country uses video/broadcasting equipment designed and manufactured by Grass Valley Group, founded in Grass Valley.

The Nevada County Narrow Gauge Railroad, built in 1876, was the only railroad in the West that was never robbed, though its primary freight was gold. (Builder-owner John Flint Kidder's reputation made it clear that he would personally hunt down and kill anyone who tried.) The rail line closed in 1942 and was torn up for scrap.
 
In Grass Valley, the historic Holbrooke Hotel opened in 1851 and housed Mark Twain, Bret Harte, and four U.S. Presidents (Ulysses S. Grant, Grover Cleveland, Benjamin Harrison, and James A. Garfield).

The community of Rough and Ready seceded from the Union for a time and became the Great Republic of Rough and Ready.

Nevada County is home to the Empire Mine State Historic Park, which is the site of one of the oldest, deepest, and richest gold mines in California. The park is in Grass Valley at 10791 East Empire Street. In operation for more than 100 years, the mine extracted 5.8 million ounces of gold before it closed in 1956.

In 1988, the 49er Fire was accidentally started by a homeless and schizophrenic local man near Highway 49. The fire went on to burn well over 100 homes and more than 33,000 acres in Nevada County.

The 2001 Nevada County shootings occurred on January 10, 2001, in which Scott Harlan Thorpe murdered three people in a shooting spree. Two of the victims were murdered in Nevada City and a third victim was killed in Grass Valley. Thorpe was arrested and declared not guilty by reason of insanity. He currently resides in Napa State Hospital.

Geography
The county is drained by Middle and South Yuba Rivers.

The western part of the county is defined by the course of several rivers and the irregular boundaries of adjoining counties. When the county was created, the founders wanted to include access to the transcontinental railroad, so a rectangular section was added that includes the railroad town of Truckee.

Nevada County is one of four counties in the United States to border a state with which it shares the same name (the other three counties are Texas County, Oklahoma; Delaware County, Pennsylvania; and Ohio County, West Virginia).

Ecology
The county has substantial areas of forest, grassland, savanna, riparian area, and other ecosystems. Forests include both coniferous- and oak-dominated woodland types. Also, numerous understory forbs and wildflowers occur, including the yellow mariposa lily (Calochortus luteus).

Adjacent counties
 Sierra County - north
 Washoe County, Nevada - east
 Placer County - south
 Yuba County - west

National protected areas
 Tahoe National Forest (part)
 Toiyabe National Forest (part)

Demographics

2020 census

Note: the US Census treats Hispanic/Latino as an ethnic category. This table excludes Latinos from the racial categories and assigns them to a separate category. Hispanics/Latinos can be of any race.

2011

Places by population, race, and income

2010 Census
The 2010 United States Census reported that Nevada County had a population of 98,764. The racial makeup of Nevada County was 90,233 (91.4%) White, 389 (0.4%) African American, 1,044 (1.1%) Native American, 1,187 (1.2%) Asian, 110 (0.1%) Pacific Islander, 2,678 (2.7%) from other races, and 3,123 (3.2%) from two or more races.  Hispanics or Latinos of any race were 8,439 persons (8.5%).

2000

As of the census of 2000, 92,033 people, 36,894 households, and 25,936 families resided in the county. The 44,282 housing units had an average density of 46 per square mile (18/km2). The racial makeup of the county was 93.4% White, 0.3% African American, 0.9% Native American, 0.8% Asian, 2.0% from other races, and 2.6% from two or more races. About 5.7% of the population were Hispanics or Latinos of any race. Regarding ancestry,16.4% were German, 16.3% English, 11.1% Irish, 6.8% Italian, and 6.6% American, according to Census 2000; 94.0% spoke English and 4.2% Spanish as their first language.

Of the 36,894 households, 28.7% had children under 18 living with them, 57.6% were married couples living together, 8.8% had a female householder with no husband present, and 29.7% were not families. About 22.8% of all households were made up of individuals, and 9.8% had someone living alone who was 65 or older.  The average household size was 2.47, and the average family size was 2.88.

In the county, the age distribution was 23.1% under 18, 6.1% from 18 to 24, 24.1% from 25 to 44, 29.3% from 45 to 64, and 17.4% who were 65 or older.  The median age was 43 years. For every 100 females, there were 98.3 males.  For every 100 females 18 and over, there were 94.7 males.

The median income for a household in the county was $45,864, and for a family was $52,697. Males had a median income of $40,742 versus $27,173 for females. The per capita income for the county was $24,007.  About 5.5% of families and 8.1% of the population were below the poverty line, including 9.5% of those under age 18 and 4.9% of those age 65 or over.

Politics

Voter registration

Cities by population and voter registration

Overview 
According to the California Secretary of State, as of February 10, 2019, Nevada County has 78,736 registered voters. Of those, 24,677 (36%) are registered Democrats, 22,252 (32.3%) are registered Republicans, 9,426 (13.76%) are registered to another party, and 7,845 (11.5%) have declined to state a political party. In both 2000 and 2004, George W. Bush won a majority of the votes in the county. In 2008, Barack Obama carried the county with a 51.5%–46.2% margin. 2008 marked the first time Nevada County went for a Democrat since Lyndon Johnson in 1964. In 2012, Obama lost by a narrow margin to Mitt Romney, turning the county red once again, only for Hillary Clinton to win it back in 2016 over Donald Trump. Joe Biden won the county in 2020 with the largest share of votes for a presidential candidate in recent elections, continuing its Democratic shift.

  
  
  
  
  
  
  
  
  
  
  
  
  
  
  
  
  
  
  
  
  
  
  
  
  
  
  
  
  
  
  
  

On November 4, 2008, Nevada County voted for Proposition 8, which amended the California Constitution to ban same-sex marriages by three votes, the narrowest margin of any county in the state.

Crime 

The following table includes the number of incidents reported and the rate per 1,000 persons for each type of offense.

Cities by population and crime rates

Transportation

Major highways
 Interstate 80
 State Route 20
 State Route 49
 State Route 89
 State Route 174

Public transportation
Gold Country Stage, operated by Nevada County, runs fixed route bus service in Grass Valley, Nevada City, Penn Valley, Alta Sierra and Lake of the Pines. A connection is available between Grass Valley and Auburn (Placer County).
Tahoe Area Rapid Transit, operated by Placer County, has a route connecting Truckee with Lake Tahoe and the state of Nevada. Truckee also has its own local bus service.
Greyhound buses and Amtrak's California Zephyr stop in Truckee and Colfax.
YubaBus offers Charter and Shuttle Bus service in and around Western Nevada County.

Gold Country Lift is the paratransit bus company providing door to door service for seniors and persons with disabilities in Grass Valley, Nevada City, and Penn Valley.

Airports
Nevada County Air Park is a general-aviation airport located just east of Grass Valley.

Truckee Tahoe Airport is a general-aviation airport in Truckee, partially in Nevada County and partially in Placer County.

Communities

Cities
Grass Valley
Nevada City (county seat)

Town
Truckee

Census-designated places

Alta Sierra
Floriston
Graniteville
Kingvale
Lake of the Pines
Lake Wildwood
North San Juan
Penn Valley
Rough and Ready
Soda Springs
Washington

Other unincorporated communities

Anthony House – Nisenan Indian territory
Birchville
Blue Tent
Boca
Boreal
Cedar Ridge
Cherokee Township
Chicago Park
French Corral
Lake City
Malakoff Diggings
Moores Flat
Nevada City Rancheria – Nisenan Indian government settlement area
Norden
North Bloomfield
North Columbia
Ophir Hill
Peardale
Ready Springs
Sunset District
Sweetland
You Bet
Wolf

Ghost town
Meadow Lake (previously: Excelsior; Summit City)

Population ranking

The population ranking of the following table is based on the 2010 census of Nevada County.

† county seat

Notable residents
Jennie Carter, 19th Century writer and journalist
Lyman Gilmore, a contemporary of the Wright Brothers who developed early powered aircraft and operated the world's first commercial air field in Grass Valley. There is also evidence he may have flown before the Wright brothers, though this claim is doubted.
 Alice Maud Hartley, killed Nevada Nevada State Senator Murray D. Foley by gunshot in 1894 
Founding member of the British rock band Supertramp, Roger Hodgson lives in Nevada County.
Herbert Hoover, President of the United States. Hoover lived in Nevada City as a young mining engineer after graduating from Stanford University.
Former Troubled Assets Relief Program head Neel Kashkari lives in the county as part of his "Washington detox."
Charles Litton Sr., a resident and entrepreneur of Nevada County who assisted Raytheon in the development of the magnetron tube.
Mark Meckler, co-founder of the Tea Party Patriots and founder of Citizens for Self-Governance
Gertrude Penhall (1846–1929), civic leader, clubwoman, early settler
Folk singer Utah Phillips lived in Nevada County until his death in 2008.
Former actor and television announcer Edwin W. Reimers resided in Nevada City at the time of his death in 1986.
Beat Poet Gary Snyder currently resides in San Juan Ridge in Nevada County.
Clint Walker, actor.
National Football League star Ricky Williams lives in the county.
Chuck Yeager, pilot and first man to break the sound barrier
John Christopher Stevens, American career diplomat and lawyer who served as the U.S. Ambassador to Libya from May 22, 2012, to September 11, 2012. Stevens was killed when the U.S. Special Mission in Benghazi, Libya, was attacked in 2012 by radical Islamic terrorists. He was born in Grass Valley and is buried in the local cemetery. A memorial to him was created in Grass Valley's downtown area.
Joanna Newsom, an American multi-instrumentalist, singer-songwriter, and actress. Born and raised in Northern California, Newsom was classically trained on the harp in her youth, and began her musical career as a keyboardist in the San Francisco-based indie band The Pleased.

See also 
List of school districts in Nevada County, California
National Register of Historic Places listings in Nevada County, California

Notes

References

Further reading
Bean, E. F. (1867). Bean's History and directory of Nevada county, California ... With sketches of the various towns and mining camps ... Also full statistics of mining and all other industrial resources. Nevada, Cal.: Printed at the Daily Gazette Book and Job Office.
Comstock, D. A. (1998). Catalog of historical landmarks and dedicated sites in Nevada County, California. NCHS books. Nevada City, Calif: Nevada County Historical Society.
Comstock, D. A. (2004). News and advertising in the early gold camps of Nevada County, California: Volume one – 1850 through 1852. Grass Valley, Calif: Comstock Bonanza Press.
Comstock, D. A., & Comstock, A. H. (1999). Nevada County vital statistics, 1850–1869 (and up to 1876 for divorces): births, marriages, separations, divorces, naturalizations, and deaths in Nevada County, California, as compiled from county records, cemeteries, newspapers, letters, diaries, and family records, plus a list of clergymen who served in Nevada County during those same years. Nevada County pioneers series, v. 1. Grass Valley, Calif: Comstock Bonanza Press.
Foley, D., Kelly, L., & Book, S. (1975). The Maidu Indians of Nevada County, California.
Nevada County (Calif.). (1915). Nevada County, state of California: the home of deep producing gold mines and prolific fruit orchards. Grass Valley, Calif: Union Pub. Co.
Nevada County Promotion Committee. (1904). Nevada County, California: the most prosperous mining county of the United States, where good mines are found in a country with a pereect [sic] climate and all the comforts of civilization. [Nevada City, Calif.]: Nevada County Promotion Committee.
Pastron, A. G., Walsh, M. R., & Clewlow, C. W. (1990). Archaeological and ethnohistoric investigations at CA-NEV-194, near Rough and Ready, Nevada County, California. Archives of California prehistory, no. 31. Salinas, CA: Coyote Press.
True, G. H. (1973). The ferns and seed plants of Nevada County, California. San Francisco: California Academy of Sciences.
Wells, H. L. (1880). History of Nevada County, California with illustrations descriptive of its scenery, residences, public buildings, fine blocks, and manufactories. Oakland, CA: Thompson & West.
Wyckoff, R. M. (1962). Hydraulicking: a brief history of hydraulic mining in Nevada County, California. Nevada City, Calif: Osborn/Woods.

External links

visitor guide
 
 

 
California counties
Counties in the Sacramento metropolitan area
1851 establishments in California
Populated places established in 1851